Henry Lee was an English professional football forward who played in the Football League for Fulham.

Personal life 
Lee worked at Dick, Kerr & Co. in Preston during the First World War.

Career statistics

References 

Fulham F.C. players
Chorley F.C. players
English Football League players
English footballers
1887 births
Footballers from Preston, Lancashire
Association football forwards
Association football outside forwards
Reading F.C. players
Gillingham F.C. players
Year of death missing
Place of death missing